Firefly is a novel written by Canadian author Philippa Dowding, and published in 2021 by DCB / Cormorant Books in Toronto, Ontario.  It won the 2021 Governor General's Literary Award for Young People’s Literature - Text.

Plot 
Firefly is a thirteen-year-old girl looking for a new home after police take her unstable and violent mother away.  She is discovered living in the park across from her mother's home and is forced by social services to live with her Aunt Gayle, owner of the Corseted Lady Costume Shop.  While Firefly adjusts to having a roof over her head, she develops post-traumatic stress disorder (PTSD) and sets out on a quest to discover her true identity.

Reception 
Firefly was generally well received in Canada.  The Governor General’s Literary Award Peer Assessment Committee for the 2021 English-language awards wrote "Firefly will shine for readers and resonate long after they close this quietly powerful book.” At Goodreads, Valerie Sherrard writes, "This is a wonderful story about a young girl who finds strength, hope and stability through her own unique process."  Teachers Guide at the 49th Shelf listed the novel for grades 4 to 7 in English Language Arts, and grades 6 to 8 in Social Science and Humanities.

Awards

References 

2021 children's books
Canadian children's books
2021 Canadian novels
Governor General's Award-winning children's books
Cormorant Books books